Duryu is a dong in Dalseo-gu, western Daegu, South Korea.  It is the site of Duryu Park and Woobang Tower Land, a popular Daegu amusement park.  Although legally a single dong, Duryu-dong is divided into three administrative dong:  Duryu-1[il]-, -2[i]-, and -3[sam]-dong.  Together, the three administrative dong cover 2.44 km2.  They were home to 34,280 people as of October 31, 2005.

The region's name comes from Duryu-san, the hill on which Daegu Woobang Tower is situated.  It is a hanja transcription of a dialect term meaning “round”, referring to the hill's rounded shape.

Daegu Subway Line 2 passes through Duryu-dong, as does the Dalgubeol Expressway.  A large number of clinics and hospitals are located in the area.

See also
Subdivisions of South Korea
Geography of South Korea

External links
Duryu-1-dong Office, in Korean
Duryu-2-dong Office, in Korean
Duryu-3-dong Office, in Korean

Dalseo District
Neighbourhoods in South Korea